Ferdinand Xhaferaj is an Albanian politician.  He was the Minister of Tourism, Cultural Affairs, Youth and Sports of that country, serving since 2009, and is a member of the Democratic Party of Albania.

Candidate for Durrës
Ferdinand Xhaferaj in 2011 resigned as MP and minister for his candidature for Durrës.

References 

Living people
Democratic Party of Albania politicians
Government ministers of Albania
Culture ministers of Albania
Tourism ministers of Albania
People from Durrës
1964 births
Members of the Parliament of Albania
21st-century Albanian politicians